A by-election was held for the New South Wales Legislative Assembly electorate of Murrumbidgee on 21 February 1876 because William Forster was appointed Agent-General in London.

Dates

Result

William Forster was appointed Agent-General in London.

See also
Electoral results for the district of Murrumbidgee
List of New South Wales state by-elections

Notes

References

1876 elections in Australia
New South Wales state by-elections
1870s in New South Wales